Fb thikana panaheda
Panahera is a village in the Kota district of Rajasthan. It is situated at a distance of 55  km from the Kota city.

The nearby towns are Sangod (9 km) kanwas 8 km. The Kali Sindh River flows nearby this village and is the main source of irrigation.

There is an upper primary school government school in the village.

The population of the village is around 500. Mostly live farmers. This Village People popular for honesty & hardworking.

Villages in Kota district